Bibbya is a genus of fruticose lichens in the family Ramalinaceae.

Taxonomy
The genus was circumscribed in 1956 by Australian botanist James Hamlyn Willis, with Bibbya muelleri assigned as the type species. The generic name honours Patrick Noel Sumner Bibby (1907–1955), a colleague with whom Willis had collaborated, and who had died the year previously.

In 1992, Einer Timdal included Bibbya in Toninia. The genus was resurrected in 2018 after a comprehensive molecular phylogeny of the family Ramalinaceae. The authors transferred several species previously placed in genus Toninia, as well as one previously placed in Bacidia.

Description
Bibbya is characterized by the presence of a reddish-brown pigment in the epithecium (the tissue layer above the asci) and in the rim of the exciple (the ring-like structure surrounding the apothecium). The thallus varies in form from crustose to squamulose or bullate (covered with rounded swellings like blisters). The ascospores range in shape from ellipsoid with a single septum, to filiform (threadlike) with multiple septa.

Species
The following list gives the species of Bibbya, followed by their taxonomic authority (standardized author abbreviations are used), year of publication (or year transferred to the genus Bibbya), and type locality.
Bibbya albomarginata  – Peru
Bibbya australis  – South Australia
Bibbya austroafricana  – Lesotho
Bibbya bullata  – Chile/Peru
Bibbya glaucocarpa  – Australian Capital Territory
Bibbya hosseusiana  – Córdoba, Argentina
Bibbya lutosa  – Switzerland
Bibbya muelleri  – Victoria (Australia)
Bibbya ruginosa  – Oakland Hills, Oakland, California
Bibbya subcircumspecta  – Scotland
Bibbya vermifera  – Sweden

References

Ramalinaceae
Lichen genera
Lecanorales genera
Taxa described in 1956
Taxa named by James Hamlyn Willis